Ernest Martin (born 1878, date of death unknown) was a French freestyle swimmer and water polo player. He competed in the men's 4000 metre freestyle event and the water polo at the 1900 Summer Olympics.

References

External links
 

1878 births
Year of death missing
French male freestyle swimmers
French male water polo players
Olympic swimmers of France
Olympic water polo players of France
Swimmers at the 1900 Summer Olympics
Water polo players at the 1900 Summer Olympics
Place of birth missing
Date of birth missing
Place of death missing
French male long-distance swimmers